Stage 2 was a UK television anthology series produced by the British Broadcasting Corporation (BBC).  Thirteen episodes aired on BBC2 under Stage 2 billing from 1971–73.  They were all productions of classic plays shown previously or subsequently on BBC1 under Play of the Month. Only Mrs. Warren's Profession is currently available on DVD.

Productions
Sourced according to the BBC Genome archive of Radio Times magazines, with archival status from TV Brain.

{| class="wikitable sortable"
|-
! Original UKtransmission date
! Title
! Author(s)
! Producer
! Director
! class="unsortable" | Performers (non-exhaustive)
! class="unsortable" | Notes
! Archive status
|-
! colspan="8" data-sort-value="ZZ" |Season One
|- id="Trelawny of the 'Wells'"
| 
| Trelawny of the 'Wells'''
| 
| 
| 
| John Alderton, Lally Bowers, Graham Crowden, Roland Culver, Rachel Kempson, Ian Ogilvy, Moira Redmond, Elizabeth Seal, Elaine Taylor, Graham Crowden, Anthony Ainley, John Cater, John Dearth, Godfrey James, Lila Kaye, Stephanie Turner, Henry Woolf
| Adapted from the play. Repeated on BBC1 13 Aug 1972 under Play of the Month.
| Survives
|- id="Candida"
| 
| Candida| 
| 
| 
| Geraldine McEwan, George Baker, Timothy Dalton, Jeremy Bulloch, Clive Revill, Priscilla Morgan
| Adapted from the play. First shown on BBC1 under Play of the Month.
| Missing
|- id="The Playboy of the Western World"
| 
| data-sort-value="Playboy of the Western World, The"|The Playboy of the Western World| 
| 
| 
| John Hurt, Sinéad Cusack, Pauline Delany, Joe Lynch, Kevin Flood, James Caffrey, Gerard Murphy
| Adapted from the play. Repeated on BBC1 11 June 1972 under Play of the Month.
| Survives
|- id="Ross"
| 
| Ross| , adapted for television by William Emms
| 
| 
| Ian McKellen, Charles Gray, Barrie Ingham, John Bennett, Martin Jarvis, Edward Fox, Brian Rawlinson, Michael Robbins, David Spenser, Hugh Walters, Simon Lack, Robert Luckham, Victor Pemberton, David Griffin, Richard Hampton
| Adapted from the play. First shown on BBC1 under Play of the Month.
| Missing
|- id="She Stoops to Conquer"
| 
| She Stoops to Conquer| 
| 
| 
| Tom Courtenay, Thora Hird, Juliet Mills, Ralph Richardson, Elaine Taylor, Terry Bale, Esmond Knight, Geoffrey Bateman
| Adapted from the play. Repeated on BBC1 23 July 1972 under Play of the Month.
| Survives
|- id="Uncle Vanya"
| 
| Uncle Vanya| , translated by Elisaveta Fen
| 
| 
| Freddie Jones, Anthony Hopkins, Ann Bell, Roland Culver, John Baskcomb, Richard Beale, Stacey Tendeter
| Adapted from the play. First shown on BBC1 under Play of the Month.
| Survives
|-
! colspan="8" data-sort-value="ZZ" |Season Two
|- id="Peer Gynt"
| 
| Peer Gynt| , English version by Norman Ginsbury
| 
| 
| Colin Blakely, Wendy Hiller, Francesca Annis, Ray Barrett, Aubrey Morris, Lois Baxter, Dudley Foster, John Franklyn-Robbins, Terence Bayler, Helen Blatch, Claire Davenport, Elroy Josephs, Andrew Lane, Mark McManus
| Adapted from the play. Repeated on BBC1 22 August 1973 under Play of the Month.
| Survives
|- id="Mrs Warren's Profession"
| 
| Mrs Warren's Profession| 
| 
| 
| Coral Browne, Penelope Wilton, James Grout, Derek Godfrey, Robert Powell, Richard Pearson
| Adapted from the play. Repeated on BBC1 21 April 1974 under Play of the Month.
| Survives
|- id="The Duchess of Malfi"
| 
| data-sort-value="Duchess of Malfi, The"|The Duchess of Malfi| 
| 
| 
| Eileen Atkins, Michael Bryant, Charles Kay, T. P. McKenna, Gary Bond, Tim Curry, Jerome Willis, Michael Godfrey, Robert James, Roy Evans, Michael Lynch, Jack Galloway, Dallas Cavell, Peter Spraggon, Talfryn Thomas, Nick Brimble
| Adapted from the play. Repeated on BBC1 18 July 1973 under Play of the Month.
| Survives
|- id="Rasputin"
| 
| Rasputin| 
| 
| 
| Robert Stephens, Peter Barkworth, Isabel Dean, Lally Bowers, T. P. McKenna, Robert Eddison, Andrew Robertson, Reg Lye, Leonard Trolley, Harry Waters, Derrick Gilbert, John Savident, James Bree
| Adapted from the play. First shown on BBC1 under Play of the Month.
| Survives
|- id="The Cherry Orchard"
| 
| data-sort-value="Cherry Orchard, The"|The Cherry Orchard| , translated by Elisaveta Fen
| 
| 
| Jenny Agutter, Ray Brooks, Laurence Carter, Christopher Gable, Charles Gray, Celia Johnson, Cyril Shaps, David Spenser, Mary Wimbush, Edward Woodward
| Adapted from the play. First shown on BBC1 under Play of the Month.
| 16mm b&w print
|- id="Stephen D"
| 
| Stephen D| , adapted by Hugh Leonard
| 
| 
| Donal McCann, David Kelly, Aidan Murphy, Brendan Price, Brenda Fricker
| Adapted from Joyce's A Portrait of the Artist as a Young Man and Stephen Hero. First shown on BBC1 under Play of the Month.
| Survives
|-
! colspan="8" data-sort-value="ZZ" |Season Three
|- id="The Shadow of a Gunman"
| 
| data-sort-value="Shadow of a Gunman, The"|The Shadow of a Gunman| 
| 
| 
| Hilary Minster, Mark Moss, Phyllis McMahon, Isolde Cazelet, Michael O'Donoughue, Keith Steven
| Adapted from the play. Repeated on BBC1 20 April 1975 under Play of the Month.
| Missing
|}

See also
Other BBC drama anthology series include
 Play of the Month Theatre 625 Second City Firsts BBC2 Playhouse Screen Two Thirty-Minute Theatre''

References

External links

1971 British television series debuts
1972 British television series endings